Sholinganallur taluk is a taluk of the city district of Chennai in the Indian state of Tamil Nadu. It was created in 2009 by the trifurcation of Tambaram taluk in Chennai district. The centre of the taluk is the neighbourhood of Sholinganallur. On 4 January 2018, Chennai district was expanded by annexing Sholinganallur taluk.

Demographics
According to the 2011 census, the taluk had a population of 548,654 with 276,828 males and 271,826 females. There were 982 women for every 1,000 men. The literacy rate was 81.23%. Child population in the age group below 6 was 28,905 males and 27,521 females.

References 

Taluks of Chennai district